This is the List of managers of the Hungary national football team.

Notes
a acting/interim

Hungary